Nerrigundah is a small village on the Eurobodalla Nature Coast in south eastern New South Wales. Situated at the head of the Tuross River Valley, it is nineteen kilometres inland from Bodalla.

The area known today as Nerrigundah lies on the traditional lands of the Walbanga people, a group of the  Yuin. The place name, Nerrigundah, is derived from an aboriginal word for 'camp where edible berries grow'.
 
Nerrigundah and its valley were used as a cattle run by Thomas Mort of Bodalla prior to the discovery of gold on 23 December 1860 by George Cook, Joseph Goodenough and William Crouch. The discovery of gold was recorded at the office of the Gold Commissioner at Braidwood, New South Wales on 2 January 1861. 

On 8 April 1866, Nerrigundah was raided by the Clarke brothers, Thomas and John, and their associates. They held up a number of passers-by outside the town at Deep Creek and then attacked the store and hotel. During the raid, William Fletcher, a new recruit to the Clarke gang, was shot dead as was Trooper Miles O'Grady when he tried to intervene. Trooper O'Grady was buried in Moruya and a monument to his memory erected at Nerrigundah.

Although the area was already a mining settlement, the site of the Village of Nerrigundah was not reserved until April 1868. The plan of the village probably reflects the irregular layout of the earlier settlement.

Gold mining in the area continued into the early years of the 20th-century. 

After the heyday of gold mining, Nerrigundah survived as a small village sustained by local production of timber, wattle bark (for tanning) and eucalyptus oil. Nerrigundah had a sawmill that provided employment, including for local Yuin people. The sawmilling company also provided housing. The sawmilling operation had ended by 2000.

The village had a school from 1863 to 1923 and again from 1959 to 1972. The village has more than one burial ground, including the cemetery dedicated in 1904. 

Nerrigundah was severely affected by bushfire, during the 2019-2020 Australian summer. On 31 December 2019, fire destroyed the village's hall and 20 of its 25 homes and one of its residents died.

References

External links 
 Media at Wikimedia Commons under Category:Nerrigundah, New South Wales
Riverbend Nelligen
South Coast Travel Guide - Nerrigundah

Towns in New South Wales
Ghost towns in New South Wales
Towns in the South Coast (New South Wales)
Eurobodalla Shire
Mining towns in New South Wales